Moskal is a surname of Polish and Russian origin.
The word literally means "Muscovite" and in modern days may is used as a pejorative for "Russian" in some cultures.

Notable people with the surname include:
Edward Moskal (1924–2005), president of the Polish American Congress
Hennadiy Moskal (born 1950), Ukrainian politician
Jiří Moskal (born 1948), Czech racing driver
Kazimierz Moskal (disambiguation)
Robert Mikhail Moskal (1937–2022), American Ukrainian Greek Catholic bishop
Tomasz Moskal (born 1975), Polish footballer

See also
 
 Moskalyov
 Moskalenko

References

Russian-language surnames
Surnames of Russian origin